Deroceras panormitanum is a species of air-breathing land slug, a terrestrial pulmonate gastropod mollusc in the family Agriolimacidae. This article is about Deroceras panormitanum sensu stricto, which occurs predominantly only on Sicily and Malta. Previous to 2011, this name was also applied to what turned out to be a distinct species, Deroceras invadens, a species which has spread around the world and is often a pest. 
Because this is a recent change in the taxonomy, for information on the species commonly referred to in the literature before 2011 as Deroceras panormitanum, please see Deroceras invadens.

This species is not listed in the IUCN red list.

Synonymy
Deroceras panormitanum was described from Palermo in Sicily. It is now widely accepted that Deroceras pollonerae also described from Palermo, Deroceras caruanae described from Valletta on Malta, and Deroceras dubium from Malta are the same species. Recently Reise et al. (2011) also synonymised Deroceras giustianum from NW Sicily but considered the status of further similar taxa from this general region as uncertain. Now that Deroceras invadens has been recognised as distinct, the morphological variation within Deroceras panormitanum sensu stricto is not as great as once thought.

Description
The skin and flesh of Deroceras panormitanum is watery and fairly transparent. The skin colour varies between pale grey, brown, and black. The mucus is colourless. Externally, Deroceras panormitanum is impossible to distinguish from Deroceras invadens and Deroceras golcheri, which occur in the same islands, and from a variety of other Deroceras species occurring elsewhere.

Internally the penis of Deroceras panormitanum has two side pockets (penial caecum and penial lobe), as in Deroceras invadens but unlike in Deroceras golcheri or related forms on Sicily. In Deroceras panormitanum the caecum is more tapering and pointed than in Deroceras invadens.  Whereas in Deroceras invadens the retractor muscle attaches directly to a point on the penis between the caecum and lobe, in Deroceras panormitanum it attaches first to the lobe. Also the penial glands often appear more knobbly than in Deroceras invadens. And inside the penis, between the distal and proximal parts, is a small flap that is absent in other species.

Reise et al. (2011) detail the mating behaviour and compare it with that of Deroceras invadens and Deroceras golcheri.

Distribution
This species is widespread on Sicily and Malta but has now been recorded also at two sites in South Wales, at one site in Ireland, at one site in northern Italy, on the Mediterranean island of Mallorca, at two neighbouring sites on Madeira, and on produce originating from the Azores.

References

External links

Deroceras panormitanum at Animalbase taxonomy,short description, distribution, biology,status (threats), images 
Deroceras panormitanum images at Encyclopedia of Life  
Fauna Europaea Search Distribution

Agriolimacidae
Gastropods described in 1882
Gastropods of Europe